Keep On Movin' or Keep On Moving may refer to:

Albums
Club Classics Vol. One, a 1989 Soul II Soul album released in the U.S. as Keep On Movin''' 
Keep On Moving (The Butterfield Blues Band album), 1969
Keep On Moving (Shaan album), 1993
Keep on Moving (ESG album), 2006Keep On Moving, a 1999 album by Funkstar De LuxeKeep On Moving, a 2001 album by SHINEmk

 Songs 
 "Keep On Movin'" (Alexia song), 1998
 "Keep On Movin'" (Five song), 1999
 "Keep On Movin'" (Soul II Soul song), 1989
 "Keep On Moving", a 1971 song by Bob Marley and the Wailers from Soul Revolution Part II "Keep On Moving", a 2006 song by Dover from Follow the City Lights "Keep On Moving", a 2017 song by Michelle Delamor featured in Just Dance 2018 "Keep On Movin'", a 2015 song by Joe Satriani from Shockwave Supernova''

Television 
 "Keep On Movin'" (Eureka Seven)